Michael Rasmussen may refer to:

Michael Rasmussen (cyclist) (born 1974), Danish cyclist
Michael Rasmussen (ice hockey) (born 1999), Canadian ice hockey player